Pursuit Force: Extreme Justice is a vehicular combat/shooter video game developed by Bigbig Studios for the PlayStation Portable, released in 2007. It is the sequel to Pursuit Force. A PlayStation 2 version was announced, but never released.

Gameplay 
The player controls the Commander of a special section of the police known as the Pursuit Force, to combat the city's gangs. Gameplay is action-packed, fast-paced and "arcadey", played from a third-person perspective. The player pursues adversaries in cars, motorbikes, helicopters and boats, usually engaging in gun combat with them. The intensity of the fast sections are broken up with on-foot and rail-shooting sequences. As in the original Pursuit Force game, in many driving sections, the player can jump from onto enemy vehicles, have a firefight with the occupants, and take over the vehicle. Missions typically last around ten minutes and are split into distinctly different gameplay segments; e.g. a mission could involve a driving protect section, followed by a helicopter turret sequence, and end with an on-foot combat area.

Enemies are from five distinctive gangs across a vast fictional state (Capital State, featuring Capital City) in America. Other members of the Pursuit Force often join the player as allies (controlled by the computer AI). A number of boss fights appear throughout the game, typically in control of vast signature vehicles (for example a huge hovercraft for the Raiders). The game features a "Justice" meter which fills as the player damages enemies and performs other feats. The Justice meter can be used for several things depending on whether it is partially filled or completely filled. When partially full, the player can partially regain vehicle and character health. When the Justice meter is full, the player can increase the damage and use a special attack, depending on the context. The player character's statistics can also be upgraded in a limited fashion as the player progresses through the game. Other features include Ad hoc multiplayer (with driving and on-foot modes), a challenge mode, and a Pursuit Force shop, where the player can buy items such as game art, videos and cheats.

The unlockable cheats are split in two categories: Cheats and Super Cheats. They can be bought from the in-game shop using stars won from the Bounty mode, and modify the difficulty of the game when active. However, if more than one cheat is active, the player can't progress in the game until all extra cheats are disabled. There are a total of 9 Cheats and 8 Super Cheats.

Extreme Justice was also meant to support cross-platform save games, allowing players to transfer progress between the PSP and PS2 versions. However, as the PS2 version was never released, this option is unusable.

Plot 
The player assumes the role of the Pursuit Force Commander, assigned with the task of taking down the biggest gangs at large in Capital State: the Raiders, professional pirates from the Deep South; the Syndicate, British bank robbers; and returning from the original Pursuit Force game, the Warlords and the Convicts. The objective is to eliminate the 'boss' of each gang, using any means necessary.

The game takes place two years after the events of the original game. The wedding of the Commander and his teammate Sarah Hunter is intruded by the Convicts, who have escaped from prison once again to seek revenge on the Pursuit Force. Shortly afterwards, a police chase commences, leading to a fight between the Commander and Billy Wilde atop a stolen fire truck.

Once Billy Wilde is defeated, the Pursuit Force is about to apprehend him. Suddenly, a new police task force called the Viper Squad appears to handle the situation themselves. Realizing they are unable to do much with the Viper Squad, the Pursuit Force now returns to handling cases that came with the arrival of two new gangs: the Raiders and the Syndicate. During a fight against the Raiders and the Warlords, Yuri "The Fury" Andreov, the Warlords' lieutenant, kills Sarah, leaving the Commander in much grief.

The Pursuit Force goes back to piecing together pieces of the puzzle as they rescue nuclear physicist Dr. Pertwee to find out why all the gangs are cooperating. During a mission of ambush on the Syndicate, they find out the Syndicate lieutenant is in fact an MI5 spy named Lucy, adding more to the complication of affairs as she is attempting to find who is carrying the majority of the nuclear weapons. It seems that the Raiders, the Convicts, and the Syndicate are merely delivering the nuclear cargo, as it is the Warlords who intend with their own reasons to launch nukes at Capital City. The leaders of the weaker gangs are summarily defeated, and just as it looks like most of the cases are closed, a mole plants a bomb in the Pursuit Force headquarters, and the resulting explosion injures the Chief.

As the Pursuit Force tries to figure out who is the mole among them, it seems all fingers are pointed at the recruits: Ashley, Preach and Gage. To make matters worse, a new unnamed masked gang begins terrorizing the city. Adding more to the issue, it is only after battling the Warlord General that it is revealed that Viper Squad Commander Decker is the one behind the entire plot. While the Warlords have gone rogue already, Decker plans to start a fascist police state in Capital City and, to be able to do so, he has his Viper Squad do the dirty job by starting a campaign of terror on the innocent civilians of the city. In other words, the masked gang turns out to be the members of the Viper Squad.

The President of the United States is arriving at Capital City for a visit, prompting the Viper Squad to ambush him. When the Pursuit Force comes to escort the President, it is revealed that Ashley is the Viper mole of the Pursuit Force. A battle on a Viper helicopter leads to the death of the mole, but Preach is still questionably missing from the team. However, worse fears are put aside as it is revealed that Preach has been fighting the Viper Squad with the cops until the team reunites. After a fight at the hospital, the demoralized Viper Squad withdraws in their mobile headquarters in an attempt to flee the city, and a final battle against Decker along the streets puts an end to the Viper Squad once and for all.

After the battle, a ceremony in honor of the Pursuit Force for their heroic effort in stopping the Viper Squad is held, but the Chief and the Commander are nowhere to be found. They are shown paying their last respects to Sarah at her grave. The Commander quits the Pursuit Force, leaving his badge and gun behind, but the Chief assures him that he will be back sometime in the future.

Characters

Pursuit Force 
 The Commander – The main protagonist from the first game. His real name is never mentioned.
 The Chief – The Commander's boss who also returns from the first game. He's a gruff moustachioed stereotype who shouts a lot and gives the Commander orders throughout missions.
 Sarah Hunter – Returning from the first game, she reprises her role as the helicopter pilot for the early portion of the story, flying the Pursuit Force helicopter during missions.
 Gage – One of the new recruits, a supporting driver with many wise cracks.
 Preach – Another new recruit, a stocky gunner who usually takes part in on-foot missions.
 Ashley – The last new recruit, an agile jumper and explosives expert.
 Lucy – An undercover MI5 agent who was tasked with infiltrating the Syndicate, posing as their lieutenant. She later takes Sarah's place as the helicopter pilot.
 Dr. Pertwee – A nuclear physicist kidnapped by the Convicts. After the Pursuit Force rescues him, he becomes the Science Specialist for the team, designing new weapons, cars, and more.

Gang personnel 
 Commander Decker – The leader of the Viper Squad. He likes to talk about how his Viper Squad is superior to the Pursuit Force.
 Billy Wilde – The lieutenant of the Convicts, returning from the first game. In the intro, he leads the Convicts out of prison and crashes the Commander and Sarah's wedding. He commands a weaponized fire truck armed with a flamethrower.
 The Striker Twins – The co-lieutenants of the Raiders. One of the twins is revealed to be named Travis, who is fought on top of a Warlords bomber.
 Yuri "The Fury" Andreov – The new lieutenant of the Warlords. He drives a massive tank.
 Lockjaw – The leader of the Raiders. He drives a gigantic hovercraft and fights using a harpoon turret mounted onto the hovercraft.
 "Hard Balls" – Returning from the first game, he is once again the leader of the Convicts. He drives an earth borer during the chase out of the mine and a demolisher during the chase through town and into the woods.
 Ed "The Shark" Pincher – The leader of the Syndicate. He drives a weaponized train that appears to be used for the purpose of transporting all of the Syndicate's loots.
 Warlord General – Another returning character from the first game, he reprises his role as the leader of the Warlords. Having returned from Cuba, he has formed the new Warlords composed of ex-Spetsnaz troopers and using Soviet weapons from the Cold War era. He commands a Soviet bomber.

Development
One of the biggest criticism of the previous instalment was the difficulty level; many players complained that Pursuit Force was too hard to beat. The developers took note of the feedback and decided to build Extreme Justice from the ground up. As a result, the sequel provides an easier difficulty than its predecessor while still bringing some decent challenges.

Reception 

The game received "average" reviews according to the review aggregation website Metacritic.

References

External links 

2007 video games
Cancelled PlayStation 2 games
Helicopter video games
PlayStation Portable games
PlayStation Portable-only games
Sony Interactive Entertainment games
Vehicular combat games
Video games about police officers
Video games scored by Jeff Tymoschuk
Video games scored by Richard Jacques
Video games developed in the United Kingdom
Multiplayer and single-player video games